The 2017 election for mayor of Rangpur City Corporation was held on 21 December 2017. Rangpur is a city in Bangladesh. The result was a victory for the Jatiya Party candidate Mostafizur Rahman Mostafa.

Mayoral election results

Reference 

2017 elections in Bangladesh
2017 in Bangladesh
Rangpur City Corporation
Local elections in Bangladesh
December 2017 events in Bangladesh